Madelyne Jennifer Pryor is a character appearing in American comic books published by Marvel Comics. Created by writer Chris Claremont and artist Paul Smith, the character first appeared in Uncanny X-Men #168 (April 1983). Madelyne Pryor is primarily featured off-and-on as an antagonist of the X-Men.  

Originally the love interest and first wife of X-Men leader Cyclops (Scott Summers), she became a long-standing member of the X-Men supporting cast, until a series of traumas—being abandoned by her husband, losing her infant son, and discovering that she was a clone of Jean Grey—eventually led to her being manipulated into being a supervillain. She is the mother of Cable.

Publication history
Madelyne Pryor was introduced during the acclaimed 1983 Uncanny X-Men run that saw long-time writer Chris Claremont pair with artist Paul Smith for a series of issues that would see the Jean Grey look-alike marry the retired X-Men leader Scott Summers (Cyclops). She first appeared in Uncanny X-Men #168 (April 1983). Multiple retcons in her publication history and that of Jean Grey have particularly complicated her biography.

Madelyne's hairstyle design was modeled on that of the book's editor at the time, Louise Jones (later Louise Simonson)—a design retained on the character until 1988. Claremont named the character after Steeleye Span singer Maddy Prior.  Claremont had already created a character named "Maddy Pryor", a little girl that appeared very briefly in Avengers Annual #10 (1981), and has no in-story connections to the X-Men character. Claremont, nonetheless, years later took an opportunity to indulge in an in-joke:  in Uncanny X-Men #238 (1988), a similar child would appear as Madelyne's mental image of herself, wearing the same clothes as the little girl from Avengers Annual #10, repeating the girl's same line of dialogue, but also singing "Gone to America", one of Steeleye Span's biggest hits.

According to Claremont, the original link between Madelyne Pryor and Jean Grey was entirely the product of Mastermind.  Seeking revenge against the X-Men after Jean (as Phoenix) had driven him insane, Mastermind uses his powers of illusion to convince Scott and the others that Madelyne is Phoenix incarnate—a cosmic threat—in an attempt to have the team kill her.  Mastermind's plan fails, and Madelyne and Cyclops are married shortly after.  Claremont had conceived Madelyne as a device to write Scott Summers out of the X-Men and have him retire "happily ever after" with Madelyne and their child.

The story became more complicated in 1986 when moves by the editors and other writers to reunite the original X-Men, for the new title X-Factor, resulted in Jean Grey's resurrection and Scott leaving his wife and son. This deeply compromised the character of Cyclops and left little room for Madelyne, and Cyclops' actions then—and towards even Jean Grey much later—have been controversial ever since. Marvel avoided addressing these problems, instead resorting to a deus ex machina, in the 1989 Inferno crossover (co-scripted by Louise Simonson, with Claremont), in which Madelyne is retconned to be a clone of Jean Grey created by Mr. Sinister to produce a child with Scott Summers, and corrupted by her anger and demonic influence into becoming the Goblin Queen, leading to her elimination and into an object of damnatio memoriae (and "nonperson" status) for several years.

Asked about his intended plans for Madelyne's character, Claremont said:

Madelyne Pryor was brought back in 1995 as a supporting character in X-Man, a marginal X-Men related title. Though by 2001 and along with the cancellation of the X-Man title, this became a false start at reviving the character, as Pryor would again cease being featured in any Marvel titles, except when Chris Claremont included the character in his non-canon limited-series, X-Men: The End (2004-2006).

In 2008, the 25th anniversary of the character's debut in Uncanny X-Men, Madelyne Pryor was brought back in the flagship X-Men title for the first time since the 1989 Inferno storyline. But the following year and the 20th anniversary since Inferno, Pryor was removed completely again, and would not be featured in another story until 2014 -- 25 years since Inferno -- in a single issue of the secondary title, X-Men (Vol. 4), and was also included in a flashback story by Claremont included in a 2014 X-Men 50th-anniversary one-shot titled X-Men: Gold (unrelated to a 2017 monthly also titled X-Men Gold).

Pryor was again absent for an extended time until featured in another flashback story also by Claremont, included in the one-shot X-Men: The Exterminated in 2018 -- 35 years since her debut. She was subsequently brought back as a recurring character, first in Hellions from 2020 to 2022, and then New Mutants in 2022. Immediately following this, Pryor was featured as a main character in the crossover storyline Dark Web, a combined sequel to both Inferno and a recent Spider-Man storyline, Beyond. Released from 2022 to the following year, its 2023 conclusion -- the 40th anniversary of the debut of Madelyne Pryor -- featured the character granted the most significant change and elevation to her status quo by Marvel since 1989.

Fictional character biography

Whirlwind romance
Madelyne Pryor was a cargo pilot in Anchorage, Alaska working for Scott Summers' grandparents when she and Scott meet during a Summers family reunion. A romantic relationship quickly begins between them; however, Scott is disturbed at her striking resemblance to his dead lover, Jean Grey/Phoenix. Also, she was the sole survivor of an airplane crash that occurred the same day Phoenix died on the moon. In addition, Professor X is unable to scan her mind (which, he notes, is occasionally the case with normal humans). Scott, still recovering from Jean's death, becomes obsessed with the idea that Madelyne is her reincarnation, eventually confronting her with his suspicions. Madelyne, furious and hurt, punches Scott and runs from him. As soon as she is alone, she is abducted by Mastermind, who had been manipulating the X-Men for months — as revenge for being driven temporarily insane by Phoenix due to his involvement in her corruption. To defeat him, Storm summons a violent storm which nearly kills Madelyne, but Scott resuscitates her. After the conflict, Scott comes to terms with the fact that Jean Grey is dead and that Madelyne is not her, and that he loves her all the same. The two are married, and Scott retires from active duty with the X-Men.

Anodyne
Giving up the life of an adventurer proves harder for Scott than imagined. Early in Madelyne and Scott's marriage, they (along with Alpha Flight and the rest of the X-Men) are taken to an abandoned city by the Asgardian trickster-god Loki. Entirely for his own purposes, Loki bestows mystical powers on a small group of non-powered humans, including Madelyne, transforming her into a healer of virtually any injury, illness, psychological issue, or physical defect. She adopts the name "Anodyne" and cures Scott's childhood head injury, enabling him to control his optic blasts without the use of ruby-quartz lenses. She also removes Aurora's DID and Wolverine's berserker rage. When it is discovered that Loki's gifts are extremely flawed, and fatal to some, everyone assembled reject the gift. Madelyne and the other beneficiaries are reverted to their original states, as are all those who had been healed by Madelyne. During this adventure Madelyne reveals that she is pregnant.

Abandonment
Going into premature labor, Madelyne gives birth to a baby boy (Nathan Christopher Charles Summers) alone in the X-Mansion. Sensing a reluctance on Scott's part to retire to family life, a powerless Storm challenges him to a duel for leadership of the team, which Storm wins. This in effect forces Scott to accept his new role as a husband and father.

Although Scott tries to live a normal family life in Alaska, he often thinks of Jean Grey, and of his life with the X-Men. Maddie tries her best to make Scott happy, but her efforts seem wasted. Finally Scott receives a call from his former teammate Angel that Jean Grey has been found alive. Without explaining himself, Scott abandons Madelyne and their son to reunite with his lost love, and forms X-Factor with his old friends from the original X-Men. Madelyne and Nathan are then attacked by the Marauders; Nathan is kidnapped and Madelyne left for dead, but survives and is hospitalized as a "Jane Doe". A guilt-wracked and increasingly unstable Scott returned home to find his house empty, and all records of his family's existence erased.

Alone and threatened, Madelyne calls the X-Men for help; they arrive and fight off another attack by the Marauders. Despairing from Scott's absence and of her son's fate, she contemplates suicide. Madelyne's brother-in-law, Alex Summers (Havok), talks her out of it, and the two of them grow closer. With the Marauders still after her, she stays with the X-Men, and they sacrifice their lives to stop the Adversary from remaking the world in Fall of the Mutants. A reporter video-interviews them before their death, and Maddie uses this to deliver a message to Scott, pleading that he find their child. With the world thinking them dead, Madelyne and the X-Men are resurrected by the Omniversal Guardian Roma and begin working secretly out of an abandoned Reavers base in Australia. Madelyne serves as the team's technical support.

Demonic corruption and origins revealed
Monitoring news transmissions, Madelyne learns that Jean Grey is alive and with Scott. She punches the computer monitor's screen, breaking it and causing electrical feedback that renders her unconscious. The Limbo demon S'ym invades Madelyne's mind during her unconscious state, and puts her in a Nightmare Sequence wherein her husband shows up and tells Madelyne he doesn't love her anymore, takes Nathan away from her, and then systematically takes away all her physical features — clothes, hair, mouth, nose and eyes — and puts them on a featureless mannequin revealed to be Jean Grey. When it's done, Jean is real again and Madelyne is the featureless mannequin, unable to even scream. They walk away happily with the baby, leaving the naked and faceless Maddie to struggle alone through a blistering wasteland, burning her away until she runs into S'ym, who offers her a deal to become more than she had been; he shows her images of a girl, a pilot, a woman, and a demon, which reflects what she was, is, and what she dreams to become. Thinking this all is just a dream, Madelyne chooses the demon, whereupon S'ym stabs her with his finger. She falls unconscious, dressed in a cropped black leather shirt, leather loincloth, and thigh-high Combat Stiletto boots, thus reflecting her eventual change into the Goblin Queen.

Afterwards, she keeps the existence of the original X-Men as X-Factor secret from the others, filtering only information and news showing X-Factor as an anti-mutant group. Later abducted by the Genoshans and taken to their island-nation, Madelyne is subjected to psychic torture intended to transform her into a docile slave of the state. Madelyne instinctively lashes out with her developing abilities, and thus causes the deaths of her torturers. In the recorded images of the psychic probe performed on Madelyne, a connection is made to the Phoenix Force, and her attire reflects again her eventual change into the Goblin Queen. Shortly after being rescued by the X-Men, Madelyne strikes a bargain with another demon, N'astirh, to find the Marauders and return her son to her. During this time, she and Alex become lovers.

To keep his end of their bargain, N'astirh takes Madelyne to the orphanage in Nebraska where Scott had grown up, actually a front for Mr. Sinister's genetic laboratory. Sinister appears and tells Madelyne about her origins. When he learned about Jean Grey, he planned to eliminate her parents and take the girl to his orphanage. Fortunately for them, Charles Xavier had already approached them and started to work with the young girl. Sinister only managed to acquire a blood and tissue sample, from which he then created a clone of her. However, the clone had no life and failed to develop any mutant powers, so Sinister left the clone in her incubation tube as a failed experiment. When Phoenix took her own life, a part of the Phoenix Force entered and awakened the clone, giving her sentience. This renewed Sinister's interest in her. Sinister named her "Madelyne Pryor", and created a false background, implanted memories and a personality designed to attract Summers, and conceived a plan to use the clone to facilitate selective breeding between her and Scott. He then planted her with Scott's grandparents' company, thus ensuring the two would eventually meet. Jean Grey's return threatened to cause the truth about Madelyne to be uncovered if the two were to meet, so Sinister tasked his Marauders with killing Madelyne and bringing him Nathan, the fruit of his scheme.

Broken in spirit and reduced to insanity by these revelations, when N'astirh gives Nathan back to her, Madelyne willingly decides to aid the demon in the "Inferno" invasion of Earth. Returning to New York City during the invasion, she confronts X-Factor. When the X-Men arrive, Madelyne manipulates the teams against each other at first, and convinces Alex to join her. X-Factor and the other X-Men work together to defeat N'astirh. Madelyne refuses to stop, forcing the heroes to overwhelm her. Cyclops is unable to act because, he admits, most of her accusations against him are true. He rescues his son, but Madelyne commits suicide in an attempt to telepathically take Jean with her. The Phoenix Force appears to Jean and offers to save her, but in order to survive Jean has to integrate the essence of both the Phoenix and Madelyne, gaining their memories and personalities. Mr. Sinister attempts to entrap all of the X-Men and X-Factor in Madelyne's dying mind, but forced to choose between having revenge either on the X-Men or Mr. Sinister, Madelyne ejects Mr. Sinister from her mind. With her personality influencing Jean's, she then prompts the X-Men and X-Factor to attempt lethal retribution against him.

Jean, having inherited Madelyne's maternal feelings for Nathan Christopher, becomes his proxy mother and briefly raises him until Apocalypse, seeing the potential threat in the child, infects him with a techno-organic virus. Dying, the child is taken 2,000 years into the future by Askani to be saved.

Reappearance
Madelyne mysteriously reappears years later as an amnesiac to Nate Grey (X-Man), the "genetic offspring" of Scott Summers and Jean Grey from the alternate reality known as the Age of Apocalypse, when he arrives into Earth-616. Under the tutelage of Selene, Madelyne eventually becomes the Hellfire Club's "Black Rook" (even becoming Sebastian Shaw's mistress), has her memories of her previous life restored by Tessa, and meets her aged son Cable in an uneasy truce.

While searching for Nate Grey she meets Threnody, who reveals to her that even though she is walking around and breathing, she is actually still dead. Angered, she murders Threnody. She then finds Nate Grey with Jean Grey and a fight ensues. Nate chooses to side with Jean over her. Then it is revealed that Madelyne is actually a "psionic construct" inadvertently resurrected by a combination of Nate Grey's psionic powers and his desperate need for a mother figure upon his arrival on Earth-616.

Antagonistic for a time after this revelation, Madelyne walks away from the Hellfire Club, turning her back on a carefully built alliance/partnership with Sebastian Shaw, and goes looking for Nate Grey. Later they are attacked by the Strikesquad: Gauntlet, a group of operatives wearing psi-shielded armor. Madelyne is buried alive by one of them but she manages to escape by teleporting. As the battle has weakened X-Man, she looks drained and withered. In no shape to continue, whatever the plans she'd had with Nate, she leaves.

Red Queen
Soon after, Nate Grey is accompanied again by Madelyne alive and well. She ends up revealing herself as the Red Queen, a Jean Grey from Earth-9575, an alternate reality where she becomes a creature of violence and unquenchable desire. She seems to have taken advantage of Madelyne's fragile state and replaced her in order to worm her way into Nate's head. She also claims to be the one who had influenced Nate into latching into Madelyne's psychic energy remnants and give it form, but she is eventually killed when Nate creates a sun around her that burns her to death. The exact details of how she had replaced Madelyne are left unrevealed, but since it is shown that the Red Queen could absorb the life forces of others to enhance her own power, she may have easily absorbed Madelyne's psionic body, or at least severed her consciousness’ connection to it. Cyclops and Cable would eventually encounter Madelyne within the telepathic astral plane, where she describes herself as now only a "ghost" and unable to return to the physical world.

Some years later, the X-Men investigate an anti-mutant group calling itself the "Hellfire Cult", being led by Empath. Empath is secretly being controlled and taking orders from a mysterious woman also calling herself the "Red Queen", who is particularly interested in learning about Cyclops' new lover Emma Frost. (Scott and Jean's marriage had fallen apart, and she died during a mission soon afterward.) The X-Men take down the Cult and capture Empath, but the Red Queen slips away unseen. She then psionically impersonates Frost and has virtual sex with Scott, without him realizing the deception. Afterward, the Red Queen travels to Madripoor where she recruits Chimera into a new group called the "Sisterhood of Mutants" and reveals herself to be Madelyne Pryor, returned to the living somehow. Later during a concert of Dazzler's, Scott is surprised at the sight of Madelyne observing him from a distance before losing her amongst the crowd.

With Martinique Jason (recruited before the Cult's exposure) and Chimera accompanying her, Madelyne recruits Spiral and Lady Deathstrike into the Sisterhood as well. Madelyne then recruits Martinique's half-sister, Lady Mastermind, who accepts membership upon Madelyne's peculiar (and ironic) promise to bring back the half-sisters' late father, the original Mastermind. Carrying out Madelyne's orders, the Sisterhood retrieves the corpse of Revanche and performs an elaborate set of procedures on Revanche and a captured Psylocke, fully restoring the body and transferring Psylocke's mind into it. Madelyne's true priority was to restore herself back into flesh and blood. In the time since the encounter in the astral plane, Pryor had eventually managed to manifest back in the physical world as an intangible entity of psionic energy, and needed to find a body to inhabit that could contain her disembodied form and psionic powers. The experiment on Psylocke served as a test run for Pryor.

The Sisterhood commences a surprise raid on the X-Men's base, quickly neutralizing several of the main X-members. Recovering from the initial attacks, the X-Men force the Sisterhood (now including a brainwashed Psylocke) to retreat. But the battle was only a distraction, as the real purpose was for Madelyne to locate Jean Grey's gravesite. Madelyne's own body had been cremated after her suicide, so Grey's seemed the only option available to her. At Jean's grave, Madelyne attempts to repeat the ritual with her corpse. However, Cyclops had correctly guessed Madelyne's goal and had arranged for Grey's body to be replaced with another, which Madelyne only learned after it is too late. The second she binds herself to the corpse, she discorporates, as the decayed body can not contain her vast psionic energies.

Avengers Vs. X-Men
During the 2012 Avengers vs. X-Men storyline, Mister Sinister creates a group of six Madelyne Pryor clones in order to take the Phoenix Force energies from the Phoenix Five (consisting of the Phoenix Force-empowered Cyclops, Colossus, Emma Frost, Magik, and Namor). Unlike the original Madelyne, none of the six clones show indications of having individual personalities or free will, but instead appear to follow Sinister completely. The Madelyne Pryor clones join Sinister's other clone creations in fighting the Phoenix Five, and manage to defeat each one. They are also able to siphon some of the energy from the Phoenix Force, but are all immediately killed by the entity, itself.

Lady Deathstrike's Sisterhood
Lady Deathstrike, whose consciousness had taken possession of a Colombian girl named Ana Cortes, formed an all new Sisterhood initially comprising her, the mutant Typhoid Mary, and the exiled Asgardian Amora (the Enchantress). The sentient bacteria Arkea possesses Lady Deathstrike's assistant Reiko and joins.  As Arkea fears being opposed by the X-Men, she wants powerhouses with the Sisterhood, so she has Enchantress use her magicks to restore Selene and makes plans to resurrect Madelyne Pryor. Ana Cortes manages to turn against Deathstrike, contact the X-Men and alert them of the Sisterhood's location, and then commit suicide in an attempt to foil Arkea's plans. Arkea is able to place Deathstrike's consciousness into Reiko, and seeing an opportunity, splices Jean Grey's DNA to Ana's body, making it a fully compatible host for Madelyne Pryor. The Enchantress then uses her magicks to retrieve Pryor's consciousness and place it into the body, reviving Madelyne (in the process, seemingly reshaping Cortes' physical appearance into Pryor's), and making her flesh-and-blood again for the first time since her own suicide. When the X-Men arrive and attack, Madelyne fights and telepathically defeats the more experienced telepath Rachel Grey. Storm offers Madelyne and Selene a deal, essentially letting them go free, as the X-Men are only after Arkea at the moment. As Madelyne and the other members of the Sisterhood don't particularly care for Arkea, they desert her, allowing all of the Arkea bacteria to be destroyed. Accompanied by Selene, Madelyne declares that she would create an all new Sisterhood.

Krakoa
Madelyne is not seen in "the first wave" of mutant villains who accept Xavier's invitation to join him on Krakoa. However, she is referenced in Mister Sinister's Red Diamond, a gossip sheet that cryptically lists Sinister's secrets, indicating that her legacy as the Goblin Queen is far from complete.

Hellions
When Mr. Sinister sent the second Hellions team of mutants to destroy his abandoned cloning farm hidden under the old Nebraska orphanage, they are surprised to find Madelyne there. 
In her Goblin Queen attire, Madelyne had captured and  tortured Sinister's former team of killers, the Marauders, and turned them into zombie-like creatures. Madelyne commands the zombified Marauders to attack the Hellions, but captures and takes Havok prisoner, deciding to reunite with her former lover, and silences him by removing his mouth. She reveals her anger that no one cared about her return and then her seeming exclusion from Krakoa, and so plans to unleash an army of cloned Marauder zombies to attack the mutant island just to be noticed and prove her existence. Havok cuts open his mouth to speak, and impresses her by admitting that he had genuine feelings for Madelyne all along back when she and Scott were together. The Hellions thwart her plans by killing all the zombies, and Madelyne is fatally shot by John Greycrow as well. As she dies, Madelyne heals Alex's injured face and tells him that she only wanted to be acknowledged and remembered. When the team returns to Krakoa, Cyclops himself tells Havok that while the Quiet Council has decided to approve resurrection for the original Marauders, they decided not to resurrect Madelyne on the grounds that she was a clone. The decision infuriates and devastates Havok, who screams at his brother that she was a real person who did in fact exist. What Havok doesn't known is that the Council had not been able to decide whether Madelyne was a clone or her own person, so her resurrection remains undecided.

Pryor's fate still weighs heavily on Havok's mind, as seen during the first Annual Hellfire Gala, when he tries to speak with Charles Xavier and Magneto about the decision. Madelyne is eventually resurrected and reunited with Havok. She is seen wearing a version of the flight suit that she had originally worn with the X-Men, positioning her as “good Madelyne” again; but when she sees herself in a mirror, it reflects her Goblin Queen persona. On top of that is the suggestion that she hadn’t wanted to be resurrected at all, recognising that she’s being cast as the prize in somebody else’s story, and understandably resentful of it.

The Labors of Magik
Immediately afterwards, Madelyne -- back in her Goblin Queen attire -- is approached by Illyana Rasputin with a proposal. Wanting to transcend her traumatic past by distancing herself from Limbo, but needing to find a new ruler for the demonic dimension, Magik -- over the objections of her fellow New Mutants -- offers handing over rulership of the realm to Pryor. Illyana regards Madelyne as suitable to take over due to Pryor's past connection to Limbo and because, like Magik, she too has survived painfully traumatic experiences and is still a damaged soul, as Illyana declares anyone normal and "untouched by darkness" to be ill-suited to rule Limbo. Seeing Limbo as a second chance for herself and the means to cut any ties with Krakoa and all the people (i.e. Sinister, Cyclops, Jean Grey, even Havok) who she resents for always defining her entire existence, Madelyne accepts Illyana's offer. Though only after the pair and their group found themselves forced to journey and fight together against foes trying to destroy Magik and seize her power, does the handover happen. With Rasputin's rulership of Limbo relinquished, Pryor -- attired in a new outfit -- is now its Queen.

Dark Web
Some time after, Ben Reilly, the wayward and now vengeful clone of Peter Parker and using the alias "Chasm", feels himself being drawn to and enters Limbo, and encounters Pryor. Feeling they have much in common as victimized and outcast clones who both believed their mutual progenitors had destroyed their lives, Madelyne and Ben form an alliance and plan to strike back. As a demonstration of their teamwork, Pryor has a demon possess a mailbox and attack Spider-Man while she and Ben watch from afar. Pryor later finds Eddie Brock wandering in Limbo as he seeks a way back to Earth to reunite with his son, and convinces Venom, as a "fellow monarch [and] single parent", that participating with her and Chasm will be mutually beneficial. Reilly's girlfriend Janine Godbe (AKA Elizabeth Tyne) requests that she be provided the means to participate alongside Ben. As Janine has also been a mistreated and victimized woman for most of her life, Madelyne sympathizes with Janine and so transforms her into a new supervillain called "Hallows' Eve".

Brock grows impatient and uncooperative with Pryor and Chasm, leading to them regressing Brock's mind back into the primitive and savage Venom of the past. Madelyne unleashes her demons into Manhattan, which Spider-Man and the X-Men battle against, while Chasm begins striking at some of Peter's friends. Though the rampaging demons are just a distraction to scatter and occupy the X-Men away from their Manhattan base, at which Venom is sent to attack as an added decoy to enable Hallows' Eve to raid the base and steal a device for Pryor. When Magik, Jean Grey, Havok, and Cyclops enter Limbo to confront Madelyne, they're taken prisoner. Grey eventually breaks free and battles Pryor, until Jean discovers that Maddie's plotting was all just to possess Jean's memories and experiences from the very brief time she was proxy mother to Nathan, the son that Maddie lost to Jean. Grey voluntarily shares all the memories with Pryor, also revealing that she had advocated from the start that Maddie be granted a Krakoan resurrection, finally seeming to mend her last unhealed emotional wounds and making peace between them.

Pryor tries to end what she started and so approaches Chasm and Hallows' Eve with this. Having not succeeded in gaining what he wanted from his vendetta on Parker, both Chasm and Eve take Maddie's abandoning of their plotting as a betrayal and so usurp Madelyne's power as ruler of Limbo. Chasm teleports a massive tower into Manhattan and launches a massive demonic invasion. Pryor then joins with the heroes to stop him.

During the climactic battle, Madelyne reasserts her rulership over the demons as Goblin Queen of Limbo and Chasm is defeated,  though Hallows' Eve escapes. In the aftermath, Maddie takes custody of Ben Reilly as her prisoner, the Limbo tower remains in place in New York as an "Embassy of Limbo", and Madelyne Pryor seems to continue to be an ally of the X-Men and Spider-Man.

Powers and abilities
As a clone of Jean Grey, Madelyne Pryor possesses mutant abilities of telepathy and telekinesis. These powers were completely dormant while she was believed to be a baseline human, but later manifested in ways that Jean's never had.

During her brief time as Anodyne, when still believed to be human, Madelyne was endowed with Asgardian magic that manifested as eldritch flames which granted her the power to heal and cure. Among her beneficial actions were fixing the childhood brain injury that prevented Cyclops from controlling his optic blasts, curing Puck of his mystically induced dwarfism, unifying Aurora's multiple personalities, and giving Rogue the ability to control her mutant power. Madelyne also seemed to gain the physical stature of an Asgardian.

As the Goblin Queen, demonic eldritch magic activated Pryor's long-dormant mutant powers, and also exponentially enhanced them to the point where she could warp reality (equivalent to the abilities of Proteus) within a localized area, possibly over an entire city.

After her apparent resurrection by Nate Grey, Madelyne regained her natural mutant abilities. Without the demonic enhancements, her powers are still considerable. Her telepathy enables her to read minds, broadcast her thoughts, create illusions, change or erase memories, and defend herself against other telepaths. With her telekinesis, Madelyne can lift and manipulate large objects, levitate, fire powerful mental force-blasts, form protective shields, and rearrange small objects on a molecular level. Madelyne also utilizes her powers to augment her physical strength and agility, making her formidable in hand-to-hand combat.

Madelyne also learned how to use her powers to teleport over long distances by psychokinetically shifting in and out of the astral plane (and was shown to be able to carry along at least one other person with her when teleporting), and was also able to channel psionic energies from other psionic-powered mutants to boost her own abilities or those of another (usually Nate Grey, and on occasion Cable). It is speculated that Selene's tutelage made these added abilities possible.

As the Red Queen, Madelyne was a non-physical entity of psionic energy (similar to the Shadow King). Along with her usual powers, Madelyne demonstrated other abilities of a mysterious nature which she referred to as "magic", which were probably related to the eldritch magics she had previously wielded. She was shown to heal wounds, locate spirits interdimensionally, and work in conjunction with science to restore life to the dead.

To prepare Madelyne to rule Limbo as its next queen, Illyana Rasputin has been teaching her other magics. The first example shown is a mystical scythe weapon (called in-print both the "Scythe of Sorrows" and the "Soul-Scythe") they created that Pryor puts to use.

Reception

Critical reception 
David Harth of CBR.com called Madelyne Pryor one of Marvel's "coolest X-Men villains", writing, "Pryor can't catch a break, which is part of what makes her interesting. She's easy to empathize with for readers, as she is definitely a character readers can feel sorry for and even root for to an extent. Her motivations make her a believable villain, and as a clone of Jean Grey, she wields a jaw-dropping amount of power."

Accolades 

 In 2014, Entertainment Weekly ranked Madelyne Pryor 30th in their "Let's rank every X-Man ever" list.
 In 2020, CBR.com ranked Madelyne Pryor 1st in their "X-Men: 10 Most Powerful Members of the Sisterhood of Mutants" list.
 In 2022, Digital Trends ranked Madelyne Pryor 6th in their "10 most powerful X-Men villains" list.
 In 2022, Screen Rant included Madeline Pryor in their "10 Best X-Men Characters Created By Chris Claremont" list and "10 New Characters We Can Hope To See In X-Men ’97" list.
 In 2022, CBR.com ranked Madelyne Pryor 9th in their "10 Coolest X-Men Villains" list.

Other versions

What If...?
In one alternate reality (Earth-89112), Madelyne Pryor and S'ym were successful in opening a portal between Limbo and Earth (having killed baby Nathan Christopher) and demons overran the planet. The X-Men and X-Factor were dead (with the exception of a possessed Wolverine), and the only resistance left was led by Doctor Strange, who attempted to summon the Phoenix Force through Rachel Summers, the reality-hopping daughter of Scott Summers and Jean Grey. Madelyne however was successful in quelling the resistance and wresting control of the Phoenix Force from Rachel, but was ultimately betrayed and killed by S'ym, using Wolverine's reanimated adamantium skeleton. Rachel, reassuming the mantle of the Phoenix, used the Force to cleanse the planet of the demon plague.

On Earth-9250, most mutants in the city of Manhattan are vampires ruled by Wolverine. Madelyne was not infected, but became the Goblyn Queen and planned on releasing a demon army to wipe out the vampire mutants and dominate the world. Madelyne made contact with the lord of the Dark Dimension, Dormammu, who became her ally. However, the vampiric Marvel Girl (Jean Grey) bonded with the Phoenix Force, became Dark Phoenix, and killed Madelyne and Dormammu.

Another reality saw Madelyne Pryor as a member of an "X-Men" team formed by Mr. Sinister alongside Cyclops (Scott Summers), Havok (Alex Summers), and Sabretooth. However this version of Madelyne had never been awakened by the Phoenix Force, so she was simply a mindless shell inhabited by the psychic entity Malice. Scott noticed his physical attraction to Madelyne, but could not respond to her advances; when he encountered Professor Xavier's X-Men and their leader Jean Grey, however, much deeper emotions were stirred. Sinister called for their deaths, and under his orders Cyclops and Havok infiltrated Xavier's X-Men as double agents.

Mutant X

In the alternate reality known as the Mutant X universe, young Scott Summers was abducted into space along with his father Christopher and mother Kate, leaving his brother Alex to become one of the founders of the X-Men as Havok. This reality's Madelyne Pryor marries Alex and has a son, named Scotty, with him. Just like in Earth-616, Madelyne also makes a deal with Limbo's demons, unlocking her latent psionic abilities, and initiates the "Inferno Crisis". In this instance however, Madelyne survives the crisis; and, using the alias "Marvel Woman", leaves the X-Men team with her husband when he forms the splinter group called "The Six". Her evil side resurfaces a number of times, first as the "Goblyn Queen" and later as the "Goblyn Force". When it returns a second time, it merges with the Beyonder to form a nigh-omnipotent being. Havok supposedly saves Madelyne by placing the "Nexus of Realities" in her body, purging her of the malevolent Goblyn Force and reuniting her with her son Scotty, before Havok returns once more to the void.

Codename: X-Men
A team of mutants forced against their will to serve in the government's Weapon-X program to hunt and neutralize all other mutants, this group includes a female telepath codenamed "Goblin Queen". Although she appears that she could be either Madelyne Pryor or Jean Grey, her real name is not revealed anywhere in the story, and no discernible reason is given for her codename.

Marvel Mangaverse
In the Marvel Mangaverse title Legacy of Fire, Madelyne Pryor was reinvented as Madelyne Pyre, a powerful sorceress and possessor of the Phoenix Sword, who was training her sister Jena to be her successor.

X-Men: The End
Madelyne Pryor plays an important role in X-Men: The End, Chris Claremont's limited series about an alternate future. In the story, Madelyne — through circumstances left unexplained — makes a surprise return. Mysteriously joined with the X-Men's alien enemies (the Skrulls and the Shi'ar), Madelyne affected a disguise to infiltrate the X-Men, planting herself near Cyclops for the rest of the series. Still seeking revenge against her former husband, Madelyne wavered however and protected him instead, after eavesdropping on Scott expressing remorse for everything that happened to her, and even implied that he genuinely loved her after all. Cyclops later admitted to having recognized her at some point, and an understanding and peace was finally reached between them, for the sake of aiding their son Cable in battle. When Cable's effort leaves him dying, a grief-stricken Madelyne is accepted back with the X-Men again. After Cyclops and Jean Grey are also killed, Madelyne cryptically reveals that, since the very beginning, she was always both Madelyne Pryor and a crucial portion of Jean Grey herself (and even hinted to being the Dark Phoenix), explaining that she was the part of Jean that truly and completely loved Scott, and that was why Jean and Scott's marriage failed. Madelyne then sacrifices herself by turning into energy and fusing with Jean Grey, who is once again resurrected. Jean is able to use her power to its fullest again, which allows her and all the dead X-Men to merge with the Phoenix and transcend to a new level of existence. In the story's final panel, Madelyne's image is present next to Cyclops' among the X-Men who died heroically.

X-Men Forever
In Claremont's series set in an alternate universe from canon, X-Men Forever, Pryor does not appear though is mentioned a number of times, as the setting is some years after her death. While nearly every significant X-Men storyline and event from the comics before 1991 is referenced during the series, no mentions are made about Inferno or the Goblin Queen, implying that these did not happen here. And while Sinister and his clonings are present, there is also no mention of Madelyne ever being a clone of Jean Grey, implying that this was also not the case here. Except for it happening after her son was born, exactly when and how Pryor died went unrevealed in the series.

Secret Wars  (2015)

Warzones: Inferno
When Doctor Doom became the God-Emperor Doom and saved remnants of the destroyed Multiverse to form Battleworld, among the salvaged worlds was a reality where the X-Men failed to stop the Inferno event instigated by the Darkchilde and the Goblin Queen. Contrary to all assumptions, Madelyne Pryor never committed the sacrificial prolicide of her baby son, and had been raising Nathan in the years since.

Doom had made Pryor the ruling Baroness of the Domain of Limbo at first, until the X-Men entrapped the demonic invasion within Manhattan and war broke out between Madelyne and Illyana, leading to Cyclops being appointed Limbo's Baron. Colossus would be forced into an alliance with Madelyne to deal with Illyana, only for Darkchilde to breach the containment and unleash Inferno on the rest of the domain. When Sinister emerged to coerce the defeated X-Men to ally with him against Darkchilde, Madelyne killed Sinister in overdue revenge. Colossus then had to kill Illyana after she massacred all the last remaining X-Men. In the aftermath, Pryor took possession of Darkchilde's demonic magic, making Madelyne the next demonic sorceress and ruler of Limbo domain, with Nathan alongside her.

Epilogue
Doom himself acknowledged Pryor's re-ascendence to Baroness. Pryor then became one of four Barons (among the others, an alternate version of Sinister) Doom chose as his "Generals" and ordered to field their armies to crush an uprising against the God Emperor. The Goblin Queen followed Doom's wishes, until betrayed and then beaten-down by Sinister and Captain Marvel.

All-New, All-Different Marvel

Following the events of the Secret Wars and the restoration of Earth-616, this version of Madelyne Pryor was able to survive the destruction of Battleworld along with her pet dragon Bamfy and a horde of goblins. They opened a portal to a storage facility in Florida, from which they planned to invade Prime Earth, however, their mustering was interrupted by Wolverine and Angel, forcing the horde to withdraw. She later opened another portal to gain access to Earth in Miami and her hordes of demons descended to wreak chaos all over the place. She also revealed that when Battleworld began collapsing, twelve hell gates inexplicably opened near the area she was and she along with Bamfy entered one that took them to Limbo where they remained in the shadows. Now once again on Earth she had her horde of demons capture the small team of X-Men that were taking a break there and was on the verge of using them for her final sacrifice until her plans were interrupted by the arrival of the mystical infused time-displace Hank McCoy which forced her to withdraw by using Bamfy to teleport her to some unknown place.

Madelyne has since been training the time-displaced Hank on how to hone his mystical capabilities. While training him, she travels across the multiverse collecting supernatural X-Men from alternate realities and promised to give them what they wanted if they help her. Madelyne then has Hank cast a ritual that summons her and her new team of supernatural X-Men, calling them her "Hex Men", and ambushes Magneto's team of X-Men in Madripoor. Her goal is to use the ritual that Beast started to summon alternate versions of herself trapped in the underworld and bring them to the surface to help her gain power. Bloodstorm sees how Madelyne has used them as a means to her own goal and knows that she will throw the Hex Men to the wolves when her main goal is accomplished. Bloodstorm convinces Beast to betray Madelyne and in doing so interrupts the ritual. Because of the interruption, the alternate versions of Madelyne drag all of the Hex Men to the underworld with them except for Bloodstorm and Beast.

Spider-Geddon
During the Spider-Geddon event, an unseen "Goblin Queen" is mentioned by her minions, Green Goblin, Hobgoblin, Demogoblin, and Jack O'Lantern when they attempt to kill Gwen Stacy but are driven away by the "Spiders-Man". It's unrevealed if this Goblin-Queen is Madelyne Pryor or someone different.

X-Men: The Exterminated
A story by Claremont again, included as an addition with the main story in The Exterminated one-shot, appears as if to be a flashback from just after Cyclops and Storm's leadership duel and his moving back to Alaska with Pryor. Circumstances shown here lead to Scott and Madelyne happily reconciling (before the discovery and return of Jean Grey). This and other differences from canon seem to place this story in the setting of Claremont's X-Men Forever universe.

X-Men: Grand Design
A limited series that does an abridged and condensed retelling of four decades of X-Men related canon from the 1960s debut onward, Pryor's introduction and early storylines are included but substantially rewritten in the second half of the title's "Second Genesis" chapter. Pryor debuts and participates in stories which originally featured Lee Forrester, who is entirely excluded in this retelling (but is name-dropped later in the series' final panel).  When Pryor and Cyclops meet and begin their relationship, she is not a pilot in Alaska but is still described as surviving a plane crash in the past, and Mastermind's actions on Pryor never happen at all in this telling before she and Cyclops marry.

Pryor's history continues in the first half of the "X-Tinction" chapter that follows, starting with the birth of Nathan/Cable and the marriage's disintegration, to concluding at her death during Inferno. While the encounter with Loki with her moment as Anodyne and her later abduction by Genosha are excluded, all the rest of her story with the X-Men is here. Pryor is emphasized as the victim in everything, not culpable for Inferno nor intending to harm her son. And her death is presented as more accidental instead of suicide.

In other media

Film

 In Deadpool 2, an Easter egg reference to Madelyne Pryor is made with an ice cream truck labeled "Pryor's Treats" appearing.

Television

 Madelyne Pryor was alluded to in the X-Men animated television series episode "Time Fugitives." Cyclops and Jean Grey learn that Cable will be important to the couple's future after Jean read Cable's mind, showing visions that include a union between Scott Summers and a red-haired woman. Cable also revealed knowing all about Cyclops and Jean while researching the X-Men's powers and abilities. Although the woman's identity was ambiguous, producer Larry Houston during the Podcast ‘Power of X-Men’ (formerly ‘Generations of X’) confirmed that it was indeed Madelyne who Jean saw.

Video games
 Madelyne Pryor in her Goblin Queen costume is available in the PC version of Marvel: Ultimate Alliance as one of Jean Grey's many custom costumes.
 Madelyne Pryor in her Hellfire Club Black Rook costume appears as the final villain in the Rachel Grey mission set in the mobile game X-Men: Battle of the Atom.
 Madelyne Pryor is a playable character in the mobile game Marvel Strike Force.

References

External links
 About Madelyne Pryor in Women Write About Comics
 ComicVine.com: Madelyne Pryor
 UncannyXmen.net Spotlight on Madelyne Pryor
 Madelyne Pryor in Fanlore Wiki
 

Comics characters introduced in 1983
Fictional avatars
Fictional aviators
Clone characters in comics
Marvel Comics characters who use magic
Marvel Comics characters who can teleport
Marvel Comics characters who have mental powers
Marvel Comics mutants 
Marvel Comics telekinetics 
Marvel Comics telepaths
Marvel Comics female supervillains
Characters created by Chris Claremont
Fictional characters who can manipulate reality 
Fictional characters with elemental transmutation abilities
Fictional characters with energy-manipulation abilities
Fictional characters with evocation or summoning abilities
Fictional suicides
Fictional sole survivors